Crew Space Transportation System (CSTS), or Advanced Crew Transportation System (ACTS), was a proposed design for a crewed spacecraft for low Earth orbit operations such as servicing the International Space Station, but also capable of exploration of the Moon and beyond. It was originally a joint project between the European Space Agency (ESA) and the Roscosmos, but later became solely an ESA project. This study was conceived as a basic strategic plan to keep a viable European human spaceflight program alive.

CSTS had completed an initial study phase, which lasted for 18 months from September 2006 to spring 2008, before the project was shut down before an ESA member state conference in November 2008. However, the head of the ESA denies that the ATV evolution plan is an alternative and talks are still ongoing as to whether or not to continue funding the ACTS plan. As of late November 2008, the project funding has been limited to a feasibility study with a launch of an actual vehicle possible no earlier than 2017.

In 2009 Russia decided it would go with a version of the original design of the CSTS and renamed it the Prospective Piloted Transport System (PPTS). ESA decided to go with an ACTS (Advanced Crew Transportation System), an evolution of the CSTS craft that would be an upgraded crewed version of the ATV spacecraft. In mid-2009 EADS Astrium was awarded a €21 million study into designing a crewed variation of the European ATV vehicle which is believed to now be the basis of the ACTS design. Since early 2013, ESA and NASA have begun cooperation on developing the European Service Module for the current version of the Orion spacecraft. This has cast previous ESA efforts concerning a crewed derivative of the ATV spacecraft into uncertainty. As of summer 2015, no known new developments on the CSTS/ACTS project have been disclosed to the public.

Background

CSTS as an answer to the Orion 
In 2004 George W. Bush announced the Vision for Space Exploration, a program that includes the United States return to the Moon by 2020 and a crewed mission to Mars by 2030.

For these purposes the Orion spacecraft was to be developed. ESA officials have inquired whether they could be part of this program for exploration, however received a negative response. Jean-Jacques Dordain, ESA's General Director stated with regard to this rejection by NASA: "I have been told by Mike Griffin and Marburger that the CEV is not for international cooperation. But if Europe is not involved in the next-generation transportation systems, we will stay forever a second-class partner."

In a July 2006 interview with New Scientist, NASA Administrator Michael Griffin however suggested interest in international cooperation in the general context of NASA's Moon exploration plans. "The US will return to the Moon but we think we will do it better, that it will be more rewarding for all, if it can do it in the company of as many of our ISS partners as we can, and with new partners." In this statement Griffin speaks of a general cooperation, not a cooperation in developing the Orion, the actual vehicle to be used for Moon missions, which will be an entirely American built spacecraft.

Cooperation with Russia 
Since 2004, ESA had been in talks with Roscosmos on cooperation for the development of Kliper, the Russian successor project to the Soyuz spacecraft, which has been in service since 1967. While ESA's management was enthusiastic about this cooperation, their member states turned down funding for a design and collaboration study in December 2005, mainly because certain member states felt that ESA would just be a minor industrial contributor to the program, while Russia would actually develop and design the Kliper spacecraft.

On the Russian side, the concept of Advanced Crew Transportation System, ACTS, conceived as a sort of "Euro-Soyuz", emerged during 2006, when Russian authorities realized that their proposal to replace the Soyuz with the Kliper was too ambitious in terms of funding.

After the December 2005 rejection of Kliper by ESA, Jean-Jacques Dordain emphasized that a collaboration with Russia on a new spacecraft could still be decided in June 2006. On June 13, 2006 the press reported that the winged Kliper project had been replaced by a study to develop a capsule under the Advanced Crew Transportation System program that ESA would fund. This rejection by ESA notwithstanding, Kliper was a Russian program that could still have been funded entirely by FKA - although this was unlikely if Russia and Europe would really have gone forward with the CSTS concept together. In mid July 2006, the Kliper tender process was cancelled, after having no winners.

Reasons given for choosing the CSTS over Kliper included that the former would offer Europe the possibility to be a full partner in a Russian-European program, because the modular structure (see below) allows for a division of design responsibilities between the partners (for instance, Russia could be in charge of the overall design of the reentry capsule, while ESA works on the habitation module etc.).

About €15 million were pledged for the CSTS program at ESA's regular meeting on June 21 and June 22, 2006. Further funding of the study was to have been asked for at the next ESA meeting in July. Both partners, Russia and ESA, would have borne their own costs in the first 2 years of the program. "We are now entering a phase of working with the Russians where we will establish a preliminary design of the vehicle, establish all the legal framework for the operation, delineate the work share for the parties, and outline the aspects of development," said Manuel Valls, head of Policy and Plans Department in ESA's Directorate of Human Spaceflight, Microgravity, and Exploration Program.

On 4 July 2006 Russian media reported that the head of the Roscosmos Anatoly Perminov had met with Jean-Jacques Dordain to discuss the CSTS proposal; however, no agreement was signed between the Russians and Europeans as a result.

On 18 July 2006 Perminov announced that the Russian tender for the Kliper spacecraft had been cancelled. It was noted that the ACTS proposal had gained more support among ESA member states than the Kliper design.

Farnborough Air Show
Jean-Jacques Dordain announced on the Farnborough Air show on July 25, 2006 that the collaborative study together with Roscosmos on the ACTS spacecraft would begin in September 2006 and end early in 2008: "So in 18 months' time we will have got[sic] a proposal to make to our ministers for the development of such a vehicle." It was confirmed that ESA's financial contribution to this study would be €15 million, shared among seven ESA member states. The work areas of the study are:
 preliminary system design examining the vehicle's configuration
 detailed subsystem design including a docking mechanism
 development of co-operation mechanisms and agreements, as well as workshare decisions for a full-scale development
 crewed lunar flights

Overall Design 
After the initial study phase was completed in May 2008, FKA and ESA announced that the overall design chosen was a conical crewed capsule with an ATV-derived service module. The CSTS spacecraft should have had a total mass of 18,000 kg. However, the capsule and service module combined mass may not have been that much.

The ACTS follows the format of the Russian Soyuz craft by having a separate descent/ascent module and a detachable orbital module. The descent module somewhat resembles the American Apollo spacecraft command module while the orbital module resembles a man-rated version of the ATV.

Possibilities of missions beyond LEO 

Manuel Valls, head of Policy and Plans Department in ESA's Directorate of Human Spaceflight, Microgravity, and Exploration Program noted on the question of available launch vehicles for the CSTS spacecraft that "although nothing at this stage is definitive, [...] both the Russians and we think that it is only prudent, and most efficient and effective, to go with 2 stages and not one. The 1-stage has been done already with Saturn V and Apollo. To do that now would entail the development of quite a new launcher and that will take time and money like hell, if I may say. Going with two stages is far more effective [...] because we could use – and this is our intention – existing launch vehicles or launch vehicles with minimal development." This means that CSTS would have had a tight mass budget, as only launchers with a maximum payload capacity in the class of Ariane 5, Proton or Angara will be available for a launch. With two launches and LEO docking that means that CSTS together with an Earth Departure Stage will not be able to weigh more than about 45 to 50 tonnes in LEO (note however that this is just for the lunar spacecraft, a lunar lander is not integrated in this calculation).

An ESA presentation from June 13, 2006 presents a lunar orbital mission of the CSTS spacecraft with 3 launches, of which two are propulsion modules to propel the spacecraft to a trans-lunar trajectory. Such a scenario, while more complicated than the 2-stage approach mentioned by Manuel Valls, gives more leeway in terms of the CSTS' mass budget.

EADS Astrium Space Transportation concepts for adapting the Ariane 5 ECB for lunar exploration could increase Ariane 5 LEO performance to 27 tonnes . These performance adaptions would entail the use of a composite solid rocket casing, and upgrades to the Vulcain Mk III and Vinci (ECSB) engines.

Proposed launch sites 
Both the ESA's site at French Guiana and the planned Russian spaceport at Vostochny were considered as launch sites for the CSTS spacecraft. It has not yet been decided yet what launcher would carry the spacecraft to orbit, however Manuel Valls indicated that beside a Russian rocket, Ariane 5 could possibly also function as the carrier rocket.

Competition within Europe
At about the same time as FKA and ESA announced their plans for the CSTS spacecraft, the German space agency DLR together with EADS Astrium announced their support for the ATV evolution proposal. This proposal envisions the development of a modified ATV with a reentry capsule that would be used to return cargo from the ISS by 2013 and in a second phase a crewed vehicle based on this modified ATV by 2017. Those dates were later revised to 2015 and 2020 respectively. This proposal was presented to ESA's governing body at its meeting in November 2008 and received funding for an initial development phase of a cargo return vehicle that may be ready by 2017. The ATV Evolution concept may have contributed to the end of the CSTS project. However, the head of the ESA denies that the ATV evolution plan is an alternative and talks are still ongoing as to whether or not to continue funding the ACTS plan.

Later developments
In 2009, Russia had decided to keep the general design of the CSTS spacecraft for their new crewed spacecraft, which eventually developed into the PPTS project. In the meantime, the European Space Agency took on a solo project modeling the ACTS after the ATV craft that carries supplies to the International Space Station. At the start of the new decade, Russian plans for the development of the PPTS became gradually postponed.

In January 2013, NASA announced that ESA would build the service module for the Orion test flight Artemis 1, which is a major step in international cooperation in deep space exploration. Subsequently, ESA signed an agreement with NASA that saw it shift part of its ATV development focus towards the development of a service module for the Orion spacecraft. This module is derived from the existing service module of the ATV resupply spacecraft.

See also

European crewed spacecraft 
Hermes, crewed spaceplane design formerly under development by ESA/CNES. Canceled in 1994.
ATV evolution plan, proposed European crewed spacecraft alternative to ACTS

Russian crewed spacecraft 
Soyuz, Soviet-era workhorse, in use by Russian agency Roscosmos
Kliper, Energia's proposed replacement for Soyuz. Canceled in 2009.
Orel (spacecraft), Russian crewed spacecraft, planned Soyuz replacement, in development.

US crewed spacecraft 
Crew Exploration Vehicle, NASA's planned Space Shuttle replacement. Cancelled in 2010.
Orion, NASA's planned Space Shuttle replacement, in co-development by NASA and ESA
SpaceX Dragon 2, SpaceX's crewed spacecraft for LEO flight contracts, successfully launched to the ISS in 2020
Boeing CST-100 Starliner, US crewed spacecraft for LEO flight contracts, launched without crew on 2019

Other crewed spacecraft 
Gaganyaan, Indian crewed spacecraft in development
Shenzhou, Chinese crewed spacecraft

References

External links

 First look at the CSTS
 The New Russian PPTS Evolution of the CSTS

Proposed European Space Agency spacecraft
Crewed spacecraft